Mahmud I (1696–1754), known as The Hunchback, was the Sultan of the Ottoman Empire from 1730 to 1754.

Mahmud I may also refer to:

 Mahmud I of Great Seljuq (fl. 1092–1094), sultan of the Seljuk Empire
 Mahmud I (mansa) (fl. 1390–c. 1400), ruler of the Mali Empire
 Sultan Mahmud I (1445–1511), Sultan of Gujarat Sultanate
 Mahmud I of Kalat (fl. 1794–1817), ruler of the princely state of Kalat

See also
 Order of Sultan Mahmud I of Terengganu
 Mahmud (disambiguation)
 Mahmud II (disambiguation)